Rune Frantsen (born 15 October 1991) is a Danish professional footballer who plays as a full-back for Danish 1st Division club Vendsyssel FF.

References

Danish men's footballers
1991 births
Living people
Vendsyssel FF players
AC Horsens players
Danish Superliga players
Danish 1st Division players
Association football defenders